George Yost Coffin (30 March 1850 – 28 November 1896) was a 19th-century political cartoonist noted for his characters and his work in Washington, D.C., particularly during the Civil War. Coffin's political cartoons appeared in The Washington Post.

Born 30 March 1850 in Pottstown, Pennsylvania, his parents were Sarah A. Harrington and George M. Coffin.

Coffin began his studies in the Preparatory Department at Columbian College in 1862. In 1904, the college changed its name to the George Washington University.

His papers are held by George Washington University.

References

1850 births
1896 deaths
People from Pottstown, Pennsylvania
American editorial cartoonists
19th-century American artists